Stenoma caesia is a moth of the family Depressariidae. It is found in Guyana.

The wingspan is 16–18 mm. The forewings are greyish purple with the costal edge whitish ocbreous and with fine whitish-ochreous lines on the margins of the cell from base to about one-third. There is a rather broad whitish-ochreous median fascia, hardly reaching the costa, the anterior edge suffused, the posterior rather convex in the disc. There is a faint darker curved subterminal shade, preceded and followed by slightly lighter suffusion, in males, the terminal area is tinged with whitish ochreous. The hindwings are grey.

References

Moths described in 1915
Taxa named by Edward Meyrick
Stenoma